Kalanta of the New Year (Αρχιμηνιά κι Αρχιχρονιά) is a Greek traditional carol (kalanta). This carol is commonly sung around the New Year and accompanied by light percussion instruments such as the Triangle (musical instrument) and Santouri.

Lyrics

References

Greek traditions
Hymns